Senator E. W. Kannangara, CCS (Sinhala: කන්නන්ගර) was a Sri Lankan civil servant and statesmen. A senator, he had a long career in the Ceylon Civil Service during which he served as a Permanent Secretary and as the Clerk of the State Council.

He also served as Chief Commissioner of Boy Scouts of Ceylon in 1954, and served on the World Scout Committee of the World Organization of the Scout Movement from 1960 until 1961. Kingsley C. Dassanaike worked to promote Scouting for the deaf and blind with his support. Kannangara participated the 11th World Scout Jamboree, Marathon Greece 1963 as a Contingent Leader from Ceylon.

His daughter Manel Abeysekera became the first Sri Lankan female diplomat.

References

External links

Members of the Senate of Ceylon
Sinhalese civil servants
Year of birth missing
Scouting and Guiding in Sri Lanka